Olite (Erriberri in Basque language) is a town and municipality located in the Comarca de Tafalla comarca, Merindad de Olite merindad, in Navarre, Spain.

History

According to Isidore of Seville's Historia de regibus Gothorum, Vandalorum et Suevorum, the town of Oligicus was founded by Swinthila, Visigothic King of Hispania (621-631) in order to control and punish the Vascones. However, this town was not heard of again until five centuries later, when the present-day town was founded and chartered. 
The Palacio Real de Olite, a fine Gothic castle-palace, was the royal seat of Charles III of Navarre.

Twin towns - sister cities

References

Bibliography
 Alejandro Díez. Olite, historia de un reino. Gráficas Lizarra. 1984.

External links

 Olite in Medieval History of Navarre
 Web del Ayuntamiento  
 OLITE in the Bernardo Estornés Lasa - Auñamendi Encyclopedia (Euskomedia Fundazioa) 

 
Gothic cities and towns
Populated places in Navarre